Clarksville, New York may refer to:

Clarksville, Albany County, New York, a hamlet
Clarksville, Allegany County, New York, a town
Clarksville, Rockland County, New York, or Clarkstown, a town